Spring Valley Township may refer to the following townships in the United States:

 Spring Valley Township, Dallas County, Iowa
 Spring Valley Township, Monona County, Iowa
 Spring Valley Township, Cherokee County, Kansas
 Spring Valley Township, McPherson County, Kansas
 Spring Valley Township, Fillmore County, Minnesota
 Spring Valley Township, Greene County, Ohio